Peter G. Palumbo (born March 27, 1961 in Providence, Rhode Island) is an American politician and a Democratic member of the Rhode Island House of Representatives representing District 16 since January 2003, until his defeat in 2014. Palumbo served consecutively from January 1995 until January 2003 in the District 25 seat.

Palumbo is perhaps best remembered for his comments regarding Jessica Ahlquist, a high school student who successfully sued to have a prayer removed from her Rhode Island public high school auditorium. On the day following the ruling, Peter Palumbo spoke on a local radio show and referred to Ahlquist as "an evil little thing".

Peter Palumbo was arrested on January 19, 2017 for embezzlement.

Education
Palumbo attended Bryant College (now Bryant University).

Elections
1994 Palumbo challenged District 25 incumbent Representative Joseph DeLorenzo in the September 13, 1994 Democratic Primary and was unopposed for the November 8, 1994 General election.
1996 Palumbo was unopposed for both the September 10, 1996 Democratic Primary, winning with 391 votes and the November 5, 1996 General election, winning with 1,778 votes.
1998 Palumbo was unopposed for both the September 15, 1998 Democratic Primary, winning with 502 votes and the November 3, 1998 General election, winning with 1,694 votes.
2000 Palumbo was challenged in the September 12, 2000 Democratic Primary, winning with 626 votes (80.3%) and was unopposed for the November 7, 2000 General election, winning with 1,948 votes.
2002 Redistricted to District 16, and with incumbent Representative Brian Patrick Kennedy redistricted to District 38, Palumbo was challenged in the September 10, 2002 Democratic Primary, winning with 883 votes (57.2%) and won the November 5, 2002 General election with 3,543 votes (69.9%) against Republican nominee Michael Bilow.
2004 Palumbo was unopposed for the September 14, 2004 Democratic Primary, winning with 214 votes and won the November 2, 2004 General election with 3,397 votes (57.8%) against Republican nominee Michael Imbruglia.
2006 Palumbo was unopposed for both the September 12, 2006 Democratic Primary, winning with 752 votes and the November 7, 2006 General election, winning with 4,485 votes.
2008 Palumbo was challenged in the September 9, 2008 Democratic Primary, winning with 551 votes (61.8%) and won the November 4, 2008 General election with 3,170 votes (54.5%) against Independent Michael McManaman.
2010 Palumbo was unopposed for the September 23, 2010 Democratic Primary, winning with 658 votes, and won the November 2, 2010 General election with 2,620 votes (54.3%) against Republican nominee Donald Botts.
2012 Palumbo was challenged in the September 11, 2012 Democratic Primary, winning with 545 votes (53.3%) and was unopposed for the November 6, 2012 General election, winning with 5,074 votes.

References

External links
Official page at the Rhode Island General Assembly
Campaign site

Peter Palumbo at Ballotpedia
Peter G. Palumbo at the National Institute on Money in State Politics

1961 births
Living people
Bryant University alumni
Democratic Party members of the Rhode Island House of Representatives
Politicians from Cranston, Rhode Island
Politicians from Providence, Rhode Island